Ragbi_klub_Podgorica (Podgorica rugby club) was founded in August 2015. The club has had a good opening season by being undefeated in its opening season. Also the club has contributed the most players to the national team of Montenegro. (13 of the 25 in the current squad)

Squad
The provisional Podgorica Rugby Squad for the 2016–17 season are:

References

2015 establishments in Montenegro
Rugby clubs established in 2015
Montenegrin rugby union teams
Sport in Podgorica